{{DISPLAYTITLE:C17H23Cl2NO}}
The molecular formula C17H23Cl2NO (molar mass: 328.27662 g/mol, exact mass: 327.1157 u) may refer to:

 Cilobamine
 Tesofensine (NS2330)

Molecular formulas